John Power (born 10 December 1959) is an English retired professional football goalkeeper who made two appearances in the Football League for Brentford, on loan from Kingstonian.

Career statistics

References

1959 births
English footballers
English Football League players
Association football goalkeepers
Brentford F.C. players
Living people
Footballers from Chelsea, London
Kingstonian F.C. players
Isthmian League players